Following is the list of cultural heritage sites in Punjab, Pakistan. The list also includes the three inscribed and  seven tentative UNESCO World Heritage Site as well as four national monuments in the province. The provincial government passed the Punjab Special Premises (Preservation) Ordinance, 1985 under which 272 sites have been protected by January 2013.

Protected sites
Following is the list of sites protected by the Federal Government of Pakistan.

Districts Attock to Khanewal 

|}

District Lahore

Districts Mianwali to Sialkot 

|}

Special premises
The monuments below have been declared Special Premises (protected site) by the Government of Punjab under the 1985 Ordinance.

Districts Chiniot to Khushab 

|}

District Lahore

Districts Layyah to Vehari 

|}

Unprotected Sites

|}

References

Buildings and structures in Punjab, Pakistan
Archaeological sites in Pakistan
Cultural heritage sites in Punjab, Pakistan